Joshua Caleb Dibb (born January 6, 1978), also known by his moniker Deakin, is an American musician who co-founded the experimental pop band Animal Collective. He is the most infrequent member of the collective appearing on only six of the group's eleven studio albums. In 2016, he made his solo debut with the album Sleep Cycle. He also occasionally works as a carpenter during musical down time.

Biography
Dibb was born on January 6, 1978, in Orange, California to Jessica B Mendlovitz and David C Dibb, who married in 1977. He began writing and recording music with childhood friend Noah Lennox (Panda Bear) in 1991.  While at The Park School of Baltimore, Josh met David Portner (Avey Tare) and Brian Weitz (Geologist) when they asked him to join their band, Automine.  Josh introduced Noah to Dave and Brian and over the next few years the four spent time playing music together and sharing tapes of music they made individually.

After high school, Panda Bear and Deakin went to Boston, where Deakin attended Brandeis University.  Avey Tare and Geologist moved to New York City to attend NYU and Columbia University respectively.  After months of playing the band finally settled on the name "Animal Collective". After touring with the group from 2004 to the end of 2006 and recording two albums, Feels and Strawberry Jam, the Water Curses EP and the visual album ODDSAC he decided to take a break from the increasingly rigorous touring schedule. After not participating in the recording of the album Merriweather Post Pavilion, he rejoined the band live on April 10, 2011 in Petaluma, California after a three-year absence.

On January 1, 2010, he played his first solo show as Deakin at The Ottobar in Baltimore, MD where he grew up. In December 2009, Deakin raised $25,985 through the Kickstarter crowdfunding platform to travel to Mali to play at the music festival Festival au Désert outside of Tomboctou in January 2010 and to record an album in early 2010.  After playing the music festival, Deakin played five shows in Europe, including a few shows opening for Panda Bear.

On January 7, 2016, Dibb sent backers of his Kickstarter campaign an announcement that his long awaited solo album was complete. The album, titled Sleep Cycle, was released on Bandcamp on April 6, 2016. "Just Am" was the first track shared from the album, accompanied by a music video.

Tour history

with Animal Collective
 2002
 Spring 2004 - Fall 2006
 Spring 2011 - December 2013
 October 2019
 2021-2022

Discography

Albums
Solo album
 Sleep Cycle (2016)

Appearances as a member of Animal Collective
Campfire Songs (2003)
Here Comes the Indian (2003)
Feels (2005)
Strawberry Jam (2007)
ODDSAC (2010) *
Centipede Hz (2012)
Tangerine Reef (2018) *
Time Skiffs (2022)

" * " indicates visual album

Singles
Splits
"Wastered" (w/ Black Dice) (2004) - Paw Tracks

Remixes
"Little Bird" (Remix of Goldfrapp), released on "Caravan Girl" UK 7-inch Picture disk and on Digital EP (June 30, 2008, Mute Records)
"Mirando" (Remix of Ratatat), released on "Mirando" single (February 3, 2009, XL Recordings)
"Boundary Waters" (Remix of Palms), released on "Boundary Waters Remixed" 12" (September 2009, Rare Book Room Records)
"Love Like A Sunset (Deakins Jam)"  (Remix of Phoenix), released digitally in 2009 (V2 Records)
"Welt Am Draht" (Remix of Pantha du Prince), released digitally in 2010 (Rough Trade Records)
"Go!" (Remix of M83) (2017, M83 Recording Inc.)
"Extra Kings" (Remix of The Avalanches) (2021, Modular Records)

Miscellaneous
"In The City That Reads" on Arto Lindsay's album Invoke (June 25, 2002, Righteous Babe Records), credited as Avey Tare, Deaken, Geologist, Panda Bear
"Seeing Twinkles" on the sampler Music for Plants (June 2005, PerfectIfOn), under the name Deaken and Geologist
"Country Report" on the cassette tape Keep + Animal Collective (March 2011, Keep)

References

External links
 Bmore Musically Informed - photos and mp3's of New Years show.

American rock guitarists
American male guitarists
American male singers
American multi-instrumentalists
1978 births
Living people
Animal Collective members
21st-century American singers